The Isuzu Erga Mio (kana:いすゞ・エルガミオ) is a medium-duty single-decker bus produced by Isuzu through the J-Bus joint venture. It is the second medium duty bus under the Mio name, after the Gala Mio intercity coach. It is built by J-Bus from Japan either as an integral bus or a bus chassis.

Models 
The Isuzu Erga Mio has a double-curvature windscreen with a rounded roof dome similar to the Erga with a separately mounted destination sign. Its Hino-rebadged version is known as the Hino Rainbow II and the Hino Rainbow. 
 KK-LR233E1/F1/J1 (1999)
 PA-LR234J1 (2004)
 PDG-LR234J2 (2007)
 SDG-LR290J1 (2011)
 SKG-LR290J1 (2012)
 SKG-LR290J2 (2016)

Model lineup 
One Step 7m/9m
Two Step 9m
Non Step 9m

See also 

 List of buses

References

External links 

 Isuzu Erga Mio Medium-duty Bus
 Isuzu Erga Mio Homepage

Bus chassis
Buses of Japan
Low-entry buses
Midibuses
Single-deck buses
Isuzu buses
Vehicles introduced in 1999